George Edward Ross (2 May 1901 – 1 January 1989) was  an Australian rules footballer who played with Richmond in the Victorian Football League (VFL).

Notes

External links 
		

1901 births
1989 deaths
Australian rules footballers from Victoria (Australia)
Richmond Football Club players